Barry Mazor is a music journalist and the author of Ralph Peer and the Making of Popular Roots Music, winner of Belmont University's Best Book on Country Music award in 2016, and "Meeting Jimmie Rodgers: How America's Original Roots Music Hero Changed the Pop Sounds of a Century," which won the same award in 2010. He has written regularly for the Wall Street Journal and he is a former senior editor and columnist for No Depression magazine. He was the host of the streaming radio show "Roots Now," on Nashville's AcmeRadioLive.

Writing 
In addition to the Wall Street Journal and No Depression, his writing has appeared in the Oxford American, the Washington Post, the Village Voice, Nashville Scene, American Songwriter, The New Republic, and the Journal of Country Music. He was awarded the Charlie Lamb Award for Excellence in Country Music Journalism in 2008. He lives in Nashville, Tennessee.

 Bibliography

Ralph Peer  and the Making of Popular Roots Music, 2014, 
Connie Smith: Just for What I Am, 2012, 
Meeting Jimmie Rodgers, 2009, 
Connie Smith: Latest Shade of Blue, 2021″
Blood Harmony: The Everly Brothers Story." Due 2025 Hachette Books.

References

External links 

 Barry Mazor author page

Living people
Writers from Nashville, Tennessee
American music historians
American male non-fiction writers
American music journalists
Year of birth missing (living people)